Adam Davis may refer to:
Adam Davis (umpire), former Australian rules football field umpire
Adam Davis (pool player), English pool player
The brother of writer Amanda Davis

See also
Adam Davies (disambiguation)
Adam Hart-Davis (born 1943), English polymath